Azzo (Italian) or Azzus (Latin) are variations of the same name. Azo, Atto, and Hatto are other variants. 

Albert Azzo I, Margrave of Milan, Italian nobleman
Albert Azzo II, Margrave of Milan (died 1097), Italian nobleman, founder of Casa d'Este
Azzo V d'Este
Azzo VI d'Este (1170–1212), Italian nobleman and condottiero
Azzo VII d'Este (1205–1264), Marquis of Ferrara
Azzo VIII d'Este (died 1308), Lord of Ferrara, Modena and Reggio
Azzo X d'Este (1344–1415), Italian condottiero
Azzo Alidosi (died 1372), Italian condottiero
Azo of Bologna (Azzo/Azzone) (fl. 1150–1230), medieval jurist
Azzone Visconti (1302–1339), Lord of Milan from 1329 until his death
 Pet name for Salvino Azzopardi (1931–2006), S.J. Maltese priest and philosopher